Iker Pozo La Rosa (born 6 August 2000) is a Spanish footballer who currently plays as a midfielder for the Croatian Football League side HNK Šibenik.

Career

Early career
Pozo's earliest football career was influenced by his older brother José Ángel's, as, when Real Madrid brought the older Pozo from UD Fuengirola Los Boliches, the entire family moved to Madrid, and Iker joined the Real Madrid academy. Five years later, when José Ángel was snapped up by Manchester City, the younger Pozo, aged 11, followed him to the Manchester City academy.

In the 2017/18 season he featured in the U19 team's UEFA Youth League run up to the semi-finals, featuring in 6 matches and gathering 2 assists.He was also moved to the U23 team, where he would feature for in the subsequent two seasons as well.

FC Eindhoven
Pozo joined the Dutch second-tier side FC Eindhoven for a season-long loan in the summer of 2020. He quickly established himself as a starter at the club, playing mostly in a more forward central midfield role than the defensive one he played at City, resulting in his first three senior goals.

Loans to Croatian clubs
In February 2022, Pozo was loaned to HNK Rijeka. In the first week, before the official paperwork arrived, he impressed the staff at the club. On his first training session after the loan was officially finalized, however, he injured his knee. After the magnetic resonance showed the injury was serious, his loan was canceled and he returned to Manchester, not having played a single official game for the club.

In February 2023, Pozo joined HNK Šibenik.

Career statistics

Club

Notes

References

2000 births
Living people
Spanish footballers
Spanish expatriate footballers
Association football midfielders
Real Madrid CF players
Manchester City F.C. players
FC Eindhoven players
Eerste Divisie players
Spanish expatriate sportspeople in the Netherlands
Expatriate footballers in the Netherlands
Expatriate footballers in Croatia